The Taylor Hills, elevation , is a set of hills southeast of Ekalaka, Montana in Carter County, Montana.

See also
 List of mountain ranges in Montana
 Whakawhiti Saddle

Notes

Mountain ranges of Montana
Landforms of Carter County, Montana